This is a list of Regions of Niger by Human Development Index as of 2021. An HDI value is calculated for the Tillabéri Region and the city of Niamey combined.

References 

Niger
Regions of Niger
Economy of Niger